Baharon Ki Manzil may refer to:

 Baharon Ki Manzil (1968 film), a 1968 Indian film directed by Yakub Hassan Rizvi
 Baharon Ki Manzil (1973 film), a 1973 Pakistani film directed by S. Suleman
 Baharon Ke Manzil (1991 film), a 1991 Indian film